The W212 and S212 Mercedes-Benz E-Class series is the fourth-generation of the E-Class range of executive cars which was produced by Mercedes-Benz between 2009 and 2016 as the successor to the W211 E-Class. The body styles of the range are:
 4-door sedan/saloon (W212)
 5-door estate/wagon (S212)

Coupé and convertible models of the E-Class of the same vintage are W204 C-Class derived and known as the C207 and A207, replacing the CLK-Class coupé and cabriolet. A high-performance E 63 AMG version of the W212 and S212 were available as well since 2009. In 2013, a facelift was introduced for the E-Class range, featuring significant styling changes, fuel economy improvements and updated safety features.

After being unveiled at the 2009 North American International Auto Show to invited members of the press and put on public display at the 2009 Geneva Motor Show, it was introduced in March 2009 for Europe and in July 2009 for North America in the saloon body style. In 2010, an estate body style became available to all markets, though the estate body style was available in Europe since August 2009. Global cumulative E-Class sales reached the milestone 550,000 vehicle mark in July 2011. Production achieved the milestone 500,000 saloon unit mark in March 2012.

The W212 E-Class was succeeded by the W213 E-Class in 2016 for the 2017 model year.

Development 
Design work began in 2004 after the development programme commenced in 2003, with the exterior design by Winifredo Camacho and interior design by Thomas Stopka being selected in 2005. After refinements and engineering considerations were made, the final design specifications were frozen in 2006. Certain elements of the exterior styling are taken from the preceding W204 C-Class and W221 S-Class each designed in 2002 and 2003. The bulging rear wheel arches are meant to be reminiscent of the fender flares of historic "Ponton" Mercedes models of the 1950s. The design of the W212 and C207 E-Class was previewed by the ConceptFASCINATION design study in September 2008.

Body styles

Saloon 
The W212 E-Class saloon was unveiled at the 2009 North American International Auto Show. The saloon went on sale in Europe in March 2009 as a 2010 model year automobile. The W212 E-Class has 3 trim levels of equipment and equipment levels: Classic, Elegance and Avantgarde.

The E-Class features several new safety technologies including driver drowsiness detection, lane departure warning, and traffic sign recognition. It also includes features that improve performance, efficiency, and comfort, such as "Direct Control" adaptive suspension, active seats (which change shape to support the passengers in corners), and movable radiator louvers which improve the vehicle's aerodynamics. Standard Mercedes-Benz safety and convenience features, such as the Electronic Stability Program (ESP), airbags, and automatic climate control, are included as well.

Estate 
The estate version (chassis code S212) was unveiled at the 2009 Frankfurt Motor Show and was released for sale in Europe on 5 August. Early models include the four-cylinder-powered E 220 CDI BlueEFFICIENCY and E 250 CDI BlueEFFICIENCY, the V6-powered E 350 CDI BlueEFFICIENCY and E 350 CGI BlueEFFICIENCY, and the V8-powered E 500. US models began sales in June 2010 for the 2011 model year.

Coupé and convertible 

The coupé (C207) was first shown at the 2009 Geneva Motor Show, while the convertible (A207) was unveiled at the 2010 North American International Auto Show. Both models replaced the previous C209/A209 CLK-Class models. The C207/A207 E-Class is based on the W204 C-Class platform, and are produced alongside each other in the Bremen plant.

Styling 
The 2009 E-Class’ design was inspired by the new design language Mercedes adopted at that time for the C-Class, S-Class, and CLS-Class. The design was considerably more angular and aggressive than its predecessors and Mercedes gave the rear haunch a bulge that they named the "Ponton flare" inspired by that of the Ponton cars from the 1950s and early '60s. Many of the changes made to give the E-Class a sportier appearance took design cues from a number of existing models, including the CLS-Class and the S-Class. The rising character line of the 2009 E-Class was inspired by the S-Class, as were the wheel-arch extensions, the door handles, and the enlarged bumpers. Meanwhile, the CLS-Class inspiration came in the form of the re-shaped headlights, featuring an edgier squared teardrop design as opposed to the previous ovoid shape. Other changes made on the 2009 model included a wider-framed grille, new air intakes, and an overall wedge-shaped profile. The 2009 E-Class has a drag coefficient of 0.25 to improve aerodynamic efficiency.

Mercedes gave the interior a subtle facelift, one that features a more spacious cockpit with height adjustable bucket front seats, remote power door locks, power mirrors, heated mirrors, 4 one-touch power windows, and remote window operation. There are also wood trims on the doors, dashboard, and center console, front and rear reading lights, a leather steering wheel, an electrochromatic inside rearview mirror, and front and rear floor mats. The entertainment aspect comes from the plethora of electronically-enhanced goodies like an AM/FM in-dash 6 CD/DVD, CD-controller with CD MP3 Playback stereo, Harman Kardon audio system a TeleAid telecommunications service, and Bluetooth wireless data link for hands-free phone capabilities.

W212 facelift (2013–2016)

Development and launch 
The fourth generation E-Class (W212) facelift was unveiled to media in December 2012 ahead of its public debut at the 2013 North American International Auto Show, it was made available for sale in early/mid 2013 as the 2014 model year. Compared to typically subtle Mercedes-Benz minor model updates, the changes to the W212 were relatively extensive. With the sales the E-Class had lost to SUVs and crossovers in Europe and America more than compensated for by demand in emerging markets, it received the "most significant model revision" Mercedes-Benz had ever undertaken, reported close to €1 billion into the development of the mid-cycle refresh. The amount of new features on the facelifted model is about the same that's expected from the release of an entirely new model. The facelift brings significant styling changes, improved engines, more standard equipment and several extra hi-tech features.

Depending on the market, the 2014 E-Class is available in the following versions. The same engine powers the E 220 CDI where it's tuned to output , while in the E 250 CDI it churns . There are also BlueTec versions of the E 250, E 300 Hybrid and E 350. The regular E 350 gets a V6 3.5-liter engine generating , while the E 400 Hybrid has the same V6 engine but with an electric motor developing an additional . The E 550 makes use of a 4.7-liter turbo charged V8 engine developing .

Styling 
The front was completely restyled, giving it a more aggressive look compared to the pre-facelift model in response to the newer BMW 5 Series and Audi A6. The twin headlamp design was replaced with a singular front light (marking the end of Mercedes's dual headlamps use), while the light elements within the headlamps helped to retain the "four-eyed" appearance. Low beam and daytime running lamps both came with partial LED as standard, while full LED technology was available as an option for the first time. The hood, with new flowing lines, and the front bumper, which was made sharper with bigger air intakes, were also completely redesigned.

In the rear, the LED taillights were given horizontal design, while Sport models featured exposed dual exhaust pipes. The doors and front fenders were re-shaped, eliminating the wheel arch bulge and replacing it with a more traditional character line in the sheet metal. The lower side crease line (which replaced the pre-facelift model's side chrome trim) extends from the rear door all the way to the front fender, hence all the side panels except for the rear quarter panel was also restyled.

The facelift could be ordered with two distinct design variants: Sport and Luxury, which featured two different front-end designs for each line. The Luxury version came with the classic saloon grille with 3-louver look and star on the hood. The Sport version featured the sports grille with integrated star, also a first time option, forming a visual link to the high performance sports car models. Sport models receive a more confident front design, using the AMG styling package that features larger air intakes and a distinct aluminum trim line along the entire lower rim of the front bumper.

The car's interior cabin was subtly revised, with the new 3-tube instrument cluster, trapezoidal head-unit display, air vents design and a new analogue clock in the center console between the two central vents, like the CLS-Class (W218). A new feature was the two-part trim which stretched across the entire dashboard, available in a wood or aluminium look, irrespective of the equipment line. There was also a redesigned centre console without a selector lever (saloons had already done away with the selector lever as part of the launch of the W212), as well as a new multi-function steering wheel with DIRECT SELECT lever and shift paddles in conjunction with the automatic transmission. If the driver had shifted up or down manually, after a set period of time the transmission would independently switch back to automatic mode to save fuel.

Equipment 
Three different suspension configurations could be ordered. The comfort-biased setup used the base DIRECT CONTROL suspension with selective damping system. The sporty DIRECT CONTROL suspension with selective damping system was lowered by 15mm. The AIRMATIC air suspension featured electronically-controlled damping. The Estate model received an air suspension with self-leveling as standard on the rear axle. All E-Classes were be fitted with an electromechanical Direct-Steer system as standard.

For infotainment, the E-Class was equipped with the COMAND system featuring AM/FM/WB radio, indash DVD/CD player, in-dash memory card slot, and Bluetooth interface for hands-free calling. Standard equipment also included a central controller with a 7-inch, high-resolution display and a color display in the instrument cluster. Optional features included: Rearview camera, COMAND navigation, SiriusXM satellite radio, Harman/Kardon Logic 7 surround sound, power rear window sunshade, heated front seats, active ventilated front seats and garage-door opener and KEYLESS-GO.

The E-Class benefited from new safety features derived from the 2014 S-Class, including the stereo multi-purpose camera which enabled the car to detect oncoming or crossing traffic, pedestrians and traffic signs up to 50 metres away.

Mercedes' Intelligent Drive technology equipped the 2014 E-Class with up to eleven new or enhanced driving assistance features. Among these were Attention Assist (giving the driver greater control over sensitivity levels), standard Collision Prevention Assist, Distronic Plus adaptive cruise control with Steering Assist, Active Lane Keeping Assist, Brake Assist Plus, and Cross Traffic Assist.

The Intelligent Light System with Adaptive Highbeam Assist PLUS used radar and stereo cameras to detect oncoming cars and operated on high beam while blanking out a section of light around them. The same system also identified pedestrians and could flash light specifically on them.

Other optional safety technologies included PRE-SAFE Brake, PRE-SAFE PLUS, PRE-SAFE Impulse, Active Parking Assist, Active Blind Spot Assist, Traffic Sign Assist and a 360-degree camera.

Specifications

Engines 

 E 500 is sold as the E 550 in the US and Canada.
 Badged as E 200 CGI BlueEFFICIENCY and E 250 CGI BlueEFFICIENCY before 2011.
 Badged as E 300 BlueEFFICIENCY, E 300 4MATIC BlueEFFICIENCY, E 350 BlueEFFICIENCY, E 350 4MATIC BlueEFFICIENCY, E 500 BlueEFFICIENCY, E 500 4MATIC BlueEFFICIENCY, E 200 CDI BlueEFFICIENCY, E 220 CDI BlueEFFICIENCY, E 220 CDI BlueEFFICIENCY Edition, E 250 CDI BlueEFFICIENCY and E 250 CDI 4MATIC BlueEFFICIENCY before 2013.
 The designation "BlueTEC" replaced the "CDI" from 2013 to 2017, as Euro 6 emissions standard effectively mandates SCR and AdBlue injection.
 E 180 models were sold in Turkey and Greece and Tunisia with a 1.6L 156HP 250NM derived from the M270  petrol engine.

Transmission

Safety

Euro NCAP 

The 2010 E-Class earned five stars out of five for occupant protection, pedestrian protection and assistance systems in the Euro NCAP test. It came standard with a number of safety systems like Collision Prevention Assist, Attention Assist, Adaptive braking technology, Daytime Running Lamps and Rain-sensing windshield wipers. The E-Class also received two "Euro NCAP Advanced" rewards for the optional PRE-SAFE and PRE-SAFE Brake safety system.

IIHS 
The 2010 E-Class was the first E-Class to earn IIHS's reputable Top Safety Pick award. Insurance Institute for Highway Safety score the E-Class Good overall in the moderate overlap front crash test, but did not pass the small front overlap. It also received Good overall in side-impact collisions, the roof strength and seat/head restraint evaluations.

The redesigned 2014 E-Class received IIHS's Top Safety Pick+ award, which also passed the small front overlap crash test. Apart from the aforementioned test, the W212 facelift also scored the Good mark in the moderate overlap front, side, roof strength and seat/head restraint evaluations.

NHTSA 
U.S. National Highway Traffic Safety Administration (NHTSA) crash testing of the 2014 US model year E-Class yielded a four-star driver and four-star passenger rating in the frontal-collision test (out of five stars). Side crash results were five out of five stars for both front and rear seats. The car scored five stars in rollover testing.

Reception 
The E-Class image suffered a downturn in the late 1990s and early 2000s. Things improved with the facelifted W211 but the introduction of the W212 series re-established the E-Class's original reputation for solid build quality and refined elegance. The W212 was also praised for having a differentiated design from the contemporary C-Class and S-Class models. Although the mid-cycle refresh was overwhelmingly praised, the design received mixed opinions as Mercedes decided to take a more streamlined direction with the redesign; replacing the twin headlamp design with a single lens design, which brought the E-Class design up to date with the ongoing F800 Style design language found on cars like the A-Class, B-Class, C-Class, S-Class, CLS-Class and M-Class.

Special models

E 63 AMG (2010–2017) 

The E 63 AMG saloon was unveiled at the 2009 New York International Auto Show. The new performance version of the E-Class is fitted with the same powertrain as the SL63 AMG, including AMG's 6.2-liter V8 and the SPEEDSHIFT MCT 7-speed sports automatic transmission with four driver-selectable modes including a fully manual mode. Similar to the C63 AMG, the new E 63 is more extensively modified than before, with a new, wider front axle, heavily revised suspension, and more distinct body panels.

In 2011, the 6.2-litre V8 was replaced by a twin-turbo version of the 5.5-litre V8 available in the E 500/E 550; power remained the same as for the earlier, naturally aspirated 6.2-litre engine. There was also a  Performance Pack version. In October 2013, the AMG S model of the E 63 was introduced; this version has  and replaces the earlier Performance Pack model. In the United States, the E 63 station wagon is only available as an AMG S, and all E 63s sold in North America now receive the 4Matic system as standard. Meanwhile, power of the "regular" E 63 AMG increased to the same level as the previous Performance Pack model.

The styling has been altered for both aesthetic and practical purposes: AMG side skirts and rear apron give the E 63 more aggressive styling, and the larger air apertures on the front of the car allow for more air intake to the naturally aspirated 6.2 litre V8. Another styling change on the E 63 is the wider, flared front wheel arches which accommodate the AMG front axle with a  track.

For 2012, Mercedes-Benz started offering a bi-turbo V8 version.

In 2013, the facelifted E 63 AMG was launched almost immediately after the facelifted standard E-Class. It has a more sporty, singular front air intakes, sideskirts, rear diffuser and black detailings in the side mirrors, front grille, wheels, and rear apron. Also for the first time it can also be had in 4Matic four-wheel drive system. It has the same M157  engine, with increased power of up to 550 bhp to last-generation's 525 bhp. With the optional AMG "S" Performance Package, the car can do 0– in 3.5 seconds; vehicles without the package takes an additional 0.1 seconds.

E-Guard 
The E-Guard armoured version, which features VR4 (formerly B4) level protection, went on sale in April 2009. As of 2011 it has an MSRP (in the Mexican market) of $1,954,900MXN Mexican Pesos, or approximately US$143,000 US Dollars.

E 250 BlueTEC concept (2009) 
The E 250 BlueTEC is a concept vehicle based on the E 250 CDI BlueEFFICIENCY saloon, but with BlueTEC selective catalytic reduction and the 7G-Tronic Plus transmission. The vehicle was unveiled at the 2009 New York Auto Show. The E 250 BlueTEC is capable of 28 MPG city/39 MPG highway.

Edition 125 anniversary (2011) 
A version commemorating Karl Benz inventing the first automobile powered by an internal combustion engine 125 years prior, for Hong Kong and Mexican markets. It is available for E 250, E 300 and E 350 models.

Motorsport 

Erebus Motorsport competed in the Australian V8 Supercars Championship with E 63 AMGs between 2013 and 2015. These race cars had very little in common with the road going versions with only the exterior being shared with the race cars.

References

External links 

 Official website
 LEAKED: 2010 Mercedes-Benz E-Class (W212) brochures with detailed specification sheets!
 NTG3 Navigation

Executive cars
W212
W212
Sedans
Station wagons
Cars introduced in 2009
2010s cars
Limousines